Ballard FC is an American soccer club based in Seattle, Washington, competing in the Northwest Division of USL League Two. They began play in the 2022 season.

The club was founded in 2021 and is owned by former Seattle Sounders FC player Lamar Neagle, Chris Kaimmer, and Sam Zisette. It is based in the Ballard neighborhood and plays home matches at the Interbay Soccer Field, a 1,000-seat stadium in Interbay. The club's largest supporters' group is The Bridge Keepers.

Ballard FC made their league debut on May 21, 2022, defeating Lane United FC 6–1 in front of 1,200 spectators.

Players and staff

Technical staff

Roster

Year-by-year

References

2021 establishments in Washington (state)
Association football clubs established in 2021
Ballard, Seattle
Soccer clubs in Seattle
USL League Two teams